This page lists public opinion polls conducted for the 2002 French legislative elections, which were held in two rounds on 9 and 16 June 2002.

Unless otherwise noted, all polls listed below are compliant with the regulations of the national polling commission (Commission nationale des sondages) and utilize the quota method.

Graphical summary 
The averages in the graphs below were constructed using polls listed below conducted by the six major French pollsters. The graphs are smoothed 14-day weighted moving averages, using only the most recent poll conducted by any given pollster within that range (each poll weighted based on recency).

First round 
The BVA poll conducted in October 1998 tested Ecology Generation (GE).

The Ipsos poll of 125 constituencies was conducted in seven categories of constituencies: 36 constituencies with left-right duels narrowly won by the left in 1997 with a weak performance of the FN in 2002, 10 constituencies with left-right duels narrowly won by the left in 1997 with the possibility of the FN advancing to the second round in 2002, 21 constituencies with triangulaires in 1997 with the FN narrowly won by the left, 4 constituencies with left-FN duels won by the left in 1997 where the right improved upon its score and could this advance to the second round in 2002, 34 constituencies with left-right duels narrowly won by the right in 1997 with a weak performance of the FN in 2002, 7 constituencies with left-right duels narrowly won by the right in 1997 with the possibility of the FN advancing to the second round in 2002, and 13 constituencies with triangulaires in 1997 with the FN narrowly won by the right.

In 125 constituencies

Second round seat projections 
Projections marked with an asterisk (*) are for 555 deputies representing metropolitan France. The Ipsos projection on 12 June was constructed using interviews in 198 constituencies where the outcome appeared uncertain.

By second round configuration 
The Ipsos poll of 125 constituencies was conducted in seven categories of constituencies: 36 constituencies with left-right duels narrowly won by the left in 1997 with a weak performance of the FN in 2002, 10 constituencies with left-right duels narrowly won by the left in 1997 with the possibility of the FN advancing to the second round in 2002, 21 constituencies with triangulaires in 1997 with the FN narrowly won by the left, 4 constituencies with left-FN duels won by the left in 1997 where the right improved upon its score and could this advance to the second round in 2002, 34 constituencies with left-right duels narrowly won by the right in 1997 with a weak performance of the FN in 2002, 7 constituencies with left-right duels narrowly won by the right in 1997 with the possibility of the FN advancing to the second round in 2002, and 13 constituencies with triangulaires in 1997 with the FN narrowly won by the right.

Older values provided by Ipsos in 198 uncertain constituencies were constructed using older national polls conducted by the pollster.

PS/PCF/LV–UMP/UDF 
Ifop specifically named the PS and UMP. Sofres specifically named the PCF, PS, and LV, and the UMP (UDF, RPR, and DVD). In 2000, Ipsos specifically named the PS, PCF, and LV, and the RPR, UDF, and DL. In the polls conducted from 10 to 11 May 2002 and of 198 constituencies, Ipsos specifically named the PS, PCF, and LV, and the RPR, UDF, and DL. Thereafter, Ipsos specifically named the PS, PCF, and LV, and the UMP and UDF.

In 198 constituencies

In 125 constituencies

PS/PCF/LV–UMP/UDF–FN 
Ifop specifically named the PS, UMP, and FN. Sofres specifically named the PCF, PS, and LV; the UMP (UDF, RPR, and DVD); and the FN and MNR. In the polls conducted from 10 to 11 May 2002 and of 198 constituencies, Ipsos specifically named the PS, PCF, and LV; the RPR, UDF, and DL; and the FN. Thereafter, Ipsos specifically named the PS, PCF, and LV; the UMP and UDF; and the FN.

Ipsos polls, denoted with an asterisk (*), only tested this scenario in constituencies where Jean-Marie Le Pen and Bruno Mégret together obtained at least 12.5% of the vote in the preceding presidential election.

In 79 of 125 constituencies

UMP–FN

PS–FN

By constituency

First round

Bouches-du-Rhône's 1st

Bouches-du-Rhône's 3rd

Bouches-du-Rhône's 4th

Bouches-du-Rhône's 5th

Bouches-du-Rhône's 8th

Pyrénées-Atlantiques's 2nd

Paris's 11th

Paris's 16th 
Bernard Pons was eligible to continue to the second round, but instead announced his retirement from politics after the first round, allowing Françoise de Panafieu to win unopposed on 16 June 2002.

Tarn-et-Garonne's 1st

Vaucluse's 4th 
Jean-Pierre Lambertin was eligible to continue through to the second round, but instead withdrew his candidacy.

Essonne's 1st

Seine-Saint-Denis's 9th

Val-d'Oise's 5th

Second round

Bouches-du-Rhône's 1st

Bouches-du-Rhône's 3rd

Bouches-du-Rhône's 4th

Bouches-du-Rhône's 5th

Bouches-du-Rhône's 8th

Pyrénées-Atlantiques's 2nd

Paris's 11th

Paris's 16th

Tarn-et-Garonne's 1st

Vaucluse's 4th

Essonne's 1st

Seine-Saint-Denis's 9th

Val-d'Oise's 5th

See also 
Opinion polling for the French presidential election, 2002
Opinion polling for the French legislative election, 2007
Opinion polling for the French legislative election, 2012
Opinion polling for the French legislative election, 2017

References

External links 
Notices of the French polling commission 

Opinion polling in France
France